Bookhead EP is a collaborative EP by alternative hip hop artists Jneiro Jarel and MF Doom under the moniker JJ Doom. It was released on Lex Records on February 17, 2014. It features 9 tracks from the 2013 Butter Edition re-release of Key to the Kuffs. The EP was re-released on Vinyl by Lex Records on May 22, 2017.

Track listing

References

2012 EPs
Lex Records albums
Albums produced by BadBadNotGood
JJ Doom albums
MF Doom albums